The governor of the Bank of Canada is the chief executive officer of the Bank of Canada and acts as chair of its board of directors. The Bank of Canada Act, 1985, S. 6(1), provides that the governor and deputy governor shall be appointed by the directors with the approval of the Governor in Council.

Tiff Macklem serves as the current governor. He assumed office on June 3, 2020.

Roles and responsibilities

 The governor and deputy governor sign each series of Canadian banknotes.
 The governor is ex-officio the alternate voter on the International Monetary Fund.

Governors and Senior Deputy Governors of the Bank of Canada

Senior Deputy Governors of the Bank of Canada

See also
 Crown corporation
 Governor of the Bank of England (UK)
 Chairman of the Federal Reserve (US)

References

Canada